The following is a list of sieges of Constantinople, a historic city located in an area which is today part of Istanbul, Turkey. The city was built on the land that links Europe to Asia through Bosporus and connects the Sea of Marmara and the Black Sea. As a transcontinental city within the Silk Road, Constantinople had a strategic value for many empires and kingdoms who tried to conquer it throughout history.

Originally known as Byzantium in classical antiquity, the first recorded siege of the city occurred in 510 BC by the Achaemenid Empire under the command of Otanes. Following this successful siege, the city fell under the rule of Persians until it won its independence again and, around 70 BC, it became part of the Roman Republic, which was succeeded by the Roman Empire. Despite being part of Rome, it was a free city until it became under siege by Septimius Severus between 193–196 and was partially sacked during the civil war. After it was captured by Constantine the Great in 324, it became the capital of the Byzantine Empire under the name of New Rome. It later became known as Constantinople and in the years that followed it became under attack by both Byzantine pretenders fighting for the throne and also by foreign powers for a total of twenty-two times. The city remained under Byzantine rule until the Ottoman Empire took over as a result of the siege in 1453, known as the Fall of Constantinople, after which no other sieges took place.

Constantinople was besieged thirty-four times throughout its history. Out of the ten sieges that occurred during its time as a city-state and while it was under Roman rule, six were successful, three were repelled and one was lifted as a result of the agreement between the parties. Three of these sieges were carried out by the Romans who claimed the throne during civil war. Of all the sieges that took place from its founding by Constantine the Great till 1453 only three were successful, twenty one were unsuccessful, and three were lifted by reaching mutual agreements. Four of these sieges took place during civil wars. The Sack of Constantinople that took place in 1204 during the Fourth Crusade caused the city to fall and established the Latin Empire. It also sent the Byzantine imperial dynasty to exile, who founded the Empire of Nicaea. Constantinople came under Byzantine rule again in 1261 who ruled for nearly two centuries. The city was taken by the Ottomans with the siege in 1453, as a result of which the Byzantine Empire came to an end. The city has been under the rule of Turks since the last siege, except for the period of Allied occupation from 1920 to 1923.

Sieges

Notes 

 The "Result" column is relative to the side that carries out the siege.
 While some sources have used Cicero and Tacitus's writings as a reference to argue that the city was in fact under a siege until it "repelled the enemies", other ancient writings found mention that a siege was planned through the sea but didn't take place due to stormy weather conditions.
 Byzantine sources give 860 and Russian sources give 866 as the year in which this siege occurred, although it is accepted that the latter is wrong.
 The year in which the siege started is controversial. Fahameddin Başar, Halil İnalcık and Konstantin Josef Jireček gave it as 1394, while Feridun Emecen and Haldun Eroğlu believed that it was 1396. In addition, some sources mention that the siege started in 1391 and ended in 1396, and that between these years, there was only one siege, the severity of which increased and decreased from time to time.

References 
Inline citations

Sources

Constantinople, sieges